Nikko Daniel Boxall (born 24 February 1992) is a New Zealand footballer who plays as a defender for Wellington Phoenix.

Club career
Having started his career in his native New Zealand with both Auckland City and Central United, Boxall relocated to the United States in 2011 to study at the Northwestern University of Illinois. He joined the school's soccer team, The Wildcats, and won numerous accolades during his time with the school. He tallied 76 appearances in total, scoring 7 goals.

After leaving school, Boxall moved to Germany, and joined Regionalliga Südwest (level 4 in the German football league system) side SVN Zweibrücken. However, after the team withdrew from the league due to insolvency, Boxall moved to Finland and joined Veikkausliiga side Vaasan Palloseura.

After two seasons with VPS, Boxall agreed a contract with fellow Veikkausliiga side Kuopion Palloseura ahead of the 2017 season.

In January 2022, Boxall joined San Diego Loyal.

In February 2023, Boxall joined Wellington Phoenix until the end of the 2022–23 A-League Men season.

Personal life
Boxall is half Samoan and is the younger brother of New Zealand international footballer Michael Boxall.

Career statistics

Club

Notes

International

References

External links
 
 
 FIFA Profile

1992 births
Living people
New Zealand association footballers
New Zealand under-20 international footballers
Samoan footballers
New Zealand expatriate association footballers
Association football defenders
Auckland City FC players
SVN Zweibrücken players
Vaasan Palloseura players
Kuopion Palloseura players
Veikkausliiga players
Viborg FF players
Seinäjoen Jalkapallokerho players
San Diego Loyal SC players
Wellington Phoenix FC players
New Zealand expatriate sportspeople in Germany
Expatriate footballers in Germany
Expatriate footballers in Finland
New Zealand expatriate sportspeople in Denmark
Expatriate men's footballers in Denmark
New Zealand sportspeople of Samoan descent
New Zealand Football Championship players
New Zealand international footballers